Holyoke High School is a public high school in western Massachusetts, United States that serves the City of Holyoke. Since 2015, the school, along with the district, has been in state receivership and through a series of changes in practices, such as innovative restorative justice disciplinary programs, has seen marked improvement in student retention and graduation rates. In the 2017-2018 school year Holyoke High received higher combined SAT scores than the average for schools in Boston, Worcester, and Springfield.

Overview
Holyoke High School is located in Holyoke just off of Interstate 391. Currently, there are approximately 1300 students enrolled in the school in both divisions. The school colors are purple and white. The school song is "Hail, Holyoke", which was written by the high school's first band director Fred Grady in 1937 and dedicated to Dr. Howard Conant, a longtime principal who served the school for 35 years.

Following two years of development, beginning in the 2018-2019 school year, the high school offers a redeveloped curriculum focused on four academies that upperclassmen will choose to participate in, these include academies in:
 Community and Global Studies
 Technology, Engineering and Design
 Performing and Media Arts
 Medical and Life Sciences

Academy coursework will build upon the general education curriculum of math, science, and language studies with additional unique course offerings as well as internships and job shadowing opportunities in the field of a student’s choice.

Juniors and seniors may also complete coursework at area colleges through the Dual College Enrollment program, including but not limited to Holyoke Community College, Springfield Technical Community College, Westfield State University, and the University of Massachusetts Amherst.

History

Established in 1852 by the city, the school's first principal was Stephen Holman, a polymath engineer, lawyer, linguist, and educator who went on to found the Holyoke Machine Company and Deane Steam Pump Works, purchased the Holyoke Paper Company, and was credited as the first to introduce modern cost accounting into the paper industry.

From 1872 to 1881, Holyoke High School was one of about a dozen New England schools which received students from the Chinese Educational Mission.

On January 21, 1924, the school hosted the first of a series of debates in the United States between feminists Adele Schreiber-Krieger of Weimar Germany and Helen Fraser of the United Kingdom, under the topic "That the Hope of Civilization Depends Upon the Continued Growth of Labor Parties Throughout the World" with Schreiber arguing for and Fraser countering.

During a visit to Holyoke in 1916, former President and future Supreme Court Chief Justice William Howard Taft gave a lecture at the high school on the institution of the US presidency. In 1969 the school was bestowed with the National Bellamy Award, presented annually to one school in the United States. Begun in 1942 by Margarette Miller, and named for Francis Bellamy, writer of the original pledge of allegiance, the award is given to a school each year which embodies the ideals of which the pledge aspires. Although the award is annually presented by an independent organization, in recognition of the school's award, Holyoke High received an official citation from President Richard Nixon, on May 13, 1969.

Athletics

The Holyoke High School has sports open to students for every season.

Spring sports
 Baseball - Boys Freshman / Boys Junior Varsity / Boys Varsity
 Softball - Girls Freshman / Girls Junior Varsity / Girls Varsity
 Tennis - Boys and Girls
 Track - Boys and Girls
 Volleyball - Boys Junior Varsity / Boys Varsity
Falls sports
 Cheerleading - Girls Junior Varsity / Girls Varsity
 Cross Country - Boys and Girls Varsity
 Field Hockey - Junior Varsity / Varsity
 Football - Boys Freshman / Boys Junior Varsity / Boys Varsity
 Golf - Boys and Girls Varsity
 Soccer - Boys and Girls Junior Varsity / Boys and Girls Varsity
 Volleyball - Girls Freshman / Girls Junior Varsity / Girls Varsity
Winter sports
 Basketball - Boys and Girls Freshman / Boys and Girls Junior Varsity / and Girls Boys Varsity
 Cheerleading - Girls Junior Varsity / Girls Varsity
 Ice Hockey - Boys and Girls Varsity
 Indoor Track - Boys and Girls Varsity
 Skiing - Boys and Girls Varsity
 Swimming - Boys and Girls Varsity
 Wrestling - Boys Varsity

Clubs and activities

Media
There is currently one school newspaper at Holyoke High School, The Holyoke Herald, which is produced by its students in the school's journalism classes. Students also air a weekly program on the local Public-access television cable TV channel titled HPS 12. Published once a year is the literary and creative arts magazine, "The Knight Writer." In addition to these publications is the yearbook which also publishes a blog on its website.

Notable alumni

 William Chadwick (1879–1962), class of 1898, late 19th and early 20th-century American impressionist painter who went on to study at the Art Students League of New York, and subsequently became a resident of the Old Lyme art colony
 Larry Chesky (1933–2011), Polka musician and manager of Rex Records, he was inducted into the International Polka Hall of Fame in Chicago for his contributions to American style "Big Band" polka. He was inducted into the International Polka Association Hall of Fame in 1985, having recorded over 100 albums by that time.
 Ray D'Addario (1920–2011), class of 1938, photographer best known for his work as the chief photographer of the Nuremberg trials in postwar Germany, particularly for his photographs of the defendant's bench, including black and white as well as color portraits of those on trial, and landscapes of the remains of the city of Nuremberg.
 Frank FitzGerald (1896–1961), class of 1914, went on to become professional football player for the Toledo Maroons, later served as a judge in Wayne County Circuit Court, Detroit. 
 Kenny Gamble (born 1965), went on to become college football player for Colgate University, holding league records for yardage attained Colgate and NCAA records for yardage; attended HHS, but transferred to Cushing Academy.
 Al Grenert (1919–2002), class of 1940, professional basketball player and college basketball head coach.
 Ron Hurst (born 1950), class of 1968, drummer for the band Steppenwolf.
 J. J. Jennings (born 1952), American football tailback and fullback who played in the World Football League (WFL).
 Melanie Kinnaman (born 1953), actress and dancer, best known for her role as Pam in Friday the 13th: A New Beginning; attended HHS, but transferred to Williston Northampton School.
 Montgomery Knight (1901–1943), class of 1918, pioneer in rotorcraft design, first director of the Guggenheim School of Aeronautics at the Georgia Institute of Technology and a founder of and long-time researcher at the Georgia Tech Research Institute.
 Frank Leja (1936–1991), class of 1954, Major League Baseball first baseman for the New York Yankees and Los Angeles Angels.
 Jim Prentice (1909–2005), class of 1929, American game designer who pioneered electronic board games and was best known for his Electronic Baseball game which he designed while still a student.
 Homer E. Newell Jr. (1915–1983), class of 1932, mathematician and NASA administrator, the principal organizer of the American space program in its early years, who managed virtually all non-military unmanned space missions for the free world from the early 1960s until his retirement in 1974.
 Archie Roberts (born 1942), class of 1960, led an undefeated Holyoke High School Knights football team during his time as quarterback, and was described by Sports Illustrated as the most widely courted high school football player in New England at that time. Went on to play for the Columbia Lions, New York Jets, and Miami Dolphins before retiring as a cardiac surgeon.
Mark Wohlers (1970), class of 1988, Major League Baseball player, most notable for his time the Atlanta Braves (1991-1999)

Notes

References

External links
 Holyoke High School, official school website
 Holyoke High School Report Card, Massachusetts Dept. of Education

1882 establishments in Massachusetts
Educational institutions established in 1882
Buildings and structures in Holyoke, Massachusetts
Public high schools in Massachusetts
Schools in Hampden County, Massachusetts
Schools in Holyoke, Massachusetts